Ryan Johnston (born February 14, 1992) is a Canadian professional ice hockey defenceman currently an unrestricted free agent. He has previously played in the National Hockey League (NHL) with the Montreal Canadiens.

Playing career
Born in Sudbury, Ontario, Johnston played three years of college hockey with the Colgate Raiders. In the summer of 2015, he signed a two-year two-way deal with the Canadiens and played the 2015–16 with Montreal's AHL affiliate, the St. John's IceCaps. After a string of injuries to Canadiens' defenceman, Johnston was called up and played his first NHL game on April 5, 2016.

At the conclusion of his entry-level contract with the Canadiens having played in 10 games over a span of two seasons, Johnston left the Canadiens as an impending restricted free agent, agreeing to a two-year contract with Top Tier SHL club, Luleå HF, on June 26, 2017. In the 2017–18 season, Johnston registered 2 goals and 11 points in 36 games on the blueline for Luleå. He was loaned at the conclusion of the season to playoff bound Swiss club, HC Lugano of the National League on February 28, 2018. Johnston enjoyed a successful post-season with Lugano, posting 10 points in just 17 games.

On September 15, 2018, Johnston transferred his SHL contract to play with Mora IK for the 2018–19 season. Johnston responded with his new club in recording a career season, by posting 3 goals and 22 points in 50 regular season games. Despite posting 6 points in 5 SHL Kvalserien games, Johnston could not prevent Mora from returning to the Allsvenskan.

As a free agent from Mora, Johnston returned to North America in securing a one-year AHL contract with the Toronto Marlies on July 18, 2019. After attending the Marlies training camp, Johnston began the 2019–20 season as a healthy scratch. Before making his debut with the Marlies, Johnston was traded to the San Diego Gulls, affiliate of the Anaheim Ducks, for future considerations on October 31, 2019.

Johnston at the conclusion of his contract with the Gulls, opted to return to Europe as a free agent. He belatedly agreed to join German outfit, the Iserlohn Roosters of the DEL, on December 18, 2020.

Personal
Johnston's sister Rebecca is a member of the Canada women's national ice hockey team and a two-time Olympic gold winner. Their uncle Mike Johnston was the head coach of the Pittsburgh Penguins in the 2014–15 and part of the 2015–16 seasons and an assistant coach with the Vancouver Canucks and the Los Angeles Kings.

Career statistics

References

External links

1992 births
Canadian expatriate ice hockey players in Sweden
Canadian ice hockey defencemen
Colgate Raiders men's ice hockey players
HC Lugano players
HPK players
Ice hockey people from Ontario
Idaho Steelheads (ECHL) players
Iserlohn Roosters players
Living people
Luleå HF players
Montreal Canadiens players
Mora IK players
San Diego Gulls (AHL) players
Sportspeople from Greater Sudbury
St. John's IceCaps players
Undrafted National Hockey League players
Canadian expatriate ice hockey players in Germany
Canadian expatriate ice hockey players in Switzerland